The 2017 IFAGG World Cup series in Aesthetic Group Gymnastics is a series of competitions officially organized and promoted by the International Federation of Aesthetic Group Gymnastics.

Formats

Medal winners

World Cup

Challenge Cup

Final ranking

World Cup

Overall medal table

External links
World Cup results

References

Aesthetic Group Gymnastics World Cup
2017 in gymnastics